Ucolo is an unincorporated community located in San Juan County, Utah, United States.

Description

The settlement is located close to the Colorado border, and its name is a portmanteau of Utah and Colorado. The nearest major highway is U.S. Route 491, and the nearest established settlement is Egnar, Colorado.

See also

References

External links

Unincorporated communities in San Juan County, Utah
Unincorporated communities in Utah